Jesse Roberts (June 23, 1834 – February 28, 1915) was an American farmer and politician from New York.

Life 
Roberts was born on June 23, 1834, in Sparta, New York.

After growing up in the family farm and attending school, he moved to Scottsburg and became a farmer there. He was town supervisor from 1885 to 1887 and served as justice of the peace and postmaster at Scottsburg. He was also town assessor, and treasurer of the Livingston County Mutual Fire Insurance Company.

In 1891, Roberts was elected to the New York State Assembly as a Republican, representing Livingston County. He served in the Assembly in 1892 and 1893.

In 1863, Roberts married Mary M. Wilbur of Sparta. They had one son, W. W. Roberts.

Roberts died at home on February 28, 1915. He was buried in the family plot in Scottsburg Union Cemetery.

References

External links 

 The Political Graveyard

1834 births
1915 deaths
People from Sparta, New York
Farmers from New York (state)
Town supervisors in New York (state)
American justices of the peace
New York (state) postmasters
19th-century American politicians
Republican Party members of the New York State Assembly
Burials in New York (state)
19th-century American judges